Karaikurichi is a village in the Udayarpalayam taluk of Ariyalur district, Tamil Nadu, India.

Demographics 

As per the 2001 census, Karaikurichi had a total population of 3778 with 1928 males and 1850 females.

Karaikurichi village has the following temples,

1. Lord Siva
2. Mariyamman

References 

Villages in Ariyalur district